Cristian Sebastián Tavio (born 22 September 1979, in Buenos Aires) is an Argentine football left back who plays for Platense in the Primera B Metropolitana.

Career

Tavio started his career in 1996 at Deportivo Paraguayo of the 4th division. In 1999, he earned a transfer to Huracán of the Argentine Primera División. His one-season spell with Huracán was the beginning of a sequence of one-season spells, the other clubs in the sequence were Estudiantes (BA), Olimpo, Independiente, Club Atlético Banfield, Colón, Arsenal de Sarandí, again Olimpo, San Martín de San Juan and Racing Club.

In December 2010, Tavio joined Belgrano.

References

External links
 Argentine Primera statistics
 

Argentine footballers
Association football defenders
Argentine Primera División players
Club Atlético Huracán footballers
Estudiantes de Buenos Aires footballers
Olimpo footballers
Club Atlético Independiente footballers
Club Atlético Banfield footballers
Club Atlético Colón footballers
Arsenal de Sarandí footballers
San Martín de San Juan footballers
Racing Club de Avellaneda footballers
Atlético Tucumán footballers
Footballers from Buenos Aires
1979 births
Living people